La Chorrera can refer to:

La Chorrera, Colombia, town in Amazonas Department, Colombia
La Chorrera, Panama, city in Panama
La Chorrera District, district containing that city